Nanaimo Harbour ferry terminal, or more commonly "Gabriola Island Ferry", is a ferry terminal owned and operated by BC Ferries in British Columbia that goes from downtown Nanaimo across the Northumberland Channel to Descanso Bay on Gabriola Island. The route is serviced by two ferries the MV Island Gwawis and the MV Island Kwigwis, which can hold up to 47 cars and 450 passengers with a total travel time of about 20 to 25 minutes.

Incidents 
At the Nanaimo terminal, on March 20, 2013 at about 2:20 am, a woman from Gabriola Island drove her van through a barrier gate, onto the docked BC Ferries' ship, and off the other side.

See also
 Nanaimo Harbour
 MV Quinitsa
 October Ferry to Gabriola

References

BC Ferries
Transport in Nanaimo
Ferry terminals in British Columbia